Gorka Iraizoz Moreno (born 6 March 1981) is a Spanish former footballer who played as a goalkeeper.

He spent most of his professional career with Athletic Bilbao, appearing in 392 official games. In La Liga he also represented Espanyol and Girona, winning the 2006 Copa del Rey with the first club.

Club career

Early years and Espanyol
Iraizoz was born in Pamplona, Navarre and raised in nearby Ansoáin. After beginning his football career with local club UDC Chantrea, he moved to the Basque Country with Athletic Bilbao, serving stints with affiliates CD Basconia and Bilbao Athletic.

Arriving at RCD Espanyol in July 2002, Iraizoz spent two seasons with its B side, also having a loan spell at SD Eibar in the second division. He made his La Liga debut on 21 December 2005, in a 2–1 away win against Deportivo de La Coruña. He was second choice behind Carlos Kameni for the 2006–07 season, but was the regular in the team's run to the final of the UEFA Cup, notably excelling in the quarter-final second leg away to S.L. Benfica (0–0 draw, 3–2 on aggregate). 

During his time in Barcelona, Iraizoz learned to speak fluent Catalan.

Athletic Bilbao
On 7 August 2007, Iraizoz signed for Athletic Bilbao for €4.6 million, returning to the club he spent one-and-a-half seasons with, this time as the undisputed starter. However, due to a severe injury, he was left out of the squad for the second part of the campaign, and his place (and shirt number) was taken by 37-year-old Armando, signed from Cádiz CF until June 2008.

Iraizoz rarely missed a league game in the following years. On 16 January 2010, his Player of the match performance helped the team hold on to its early home lead against Real Madrid, constantly denying Kaká and Cristiano Ronaldo's efforts. Additionally, he was in goal during the 2009 and 2012 finals of the Copa del Rey lost to FC Barcelona, and also helped defeat that opponent 5–1 on aggregate in the 2015 Supercopa de España for his only accolade at the San Mamés Stadium.

In the opening match of 2014–15, at Málaga CF, Iraizoz appeared to score a last-minute equaliser with a header, but the goal was disallowed, apparently incorrectly. Having lost his starting place to Kepa Arrizabalaga, at the end of the 2016–17 season Athletic announced that the 36-year-old would be leaving the club at the end of his contract.

Girona
On 14 June 2017, Iraizoz agreed to a two-year deal at Girona FC, promoted to the top flight for the first time ever. He spent most of his spell at the Estadi Montilivi as backup to Yassine Bounou.

Iraizoz left the club at the end of the 2018–19 season, which ended in relegation.

International career
Iraizoz never earned any caps for Spain at any level. He did feature for the unofficial Basque Country regional team.

Career statistics

Honours
Espanyol
Copa del Rey: 2005–06
Supercopa de España runner-up: 2006
UEFA Cup runner-up: 2006–07

Athletic Bilbao
Supercopa de España: 2015; Runner-up 2009
UEFA Europa League runner-up: 2011–12
Copa del Rey runner-up: 2008–09, 2011–12, 2014–15

References

External links

1981 births
Living people
Spanish footballers
Footballers from Pamplona
Association football goalkeepers
La Liga players
Segunda División players
Segunda División B players
Tercera División players
CD Basconia footballers
Bilbao Athletic footballers
Gernika Club footballers
RCD Espanyol B footballers
RCD Espanyol footballers
SD Eibar footballers
Athletic Bilbao footballers
Girona FC players
Basque Country international footballers